Gerlinde Dullnig is an Austrian para-alpine skier. She represented Austria at the 1984 Winter Paralympics in four alpine skiing events.

Career 
At the 1984 Winter Paralympics, she won the bronze medal in the Women's Downhill LW6/8 event.

She finished in 4th place in the giant slalom, and combined, and in 6th place in the slalom.

See also 
 List of Paralympic medalists in alpine skiing

References 

Living people
Year of birth missing (living people)
Place of birth missing (living people)
Austrian female alpine skiers
Paralympic alpine skiers of Austria
Alpine skiers at the 1984 Winter Paralympics
Paralympic bronze medalists for Austria
Paralympic medalists in alpine skiing
Medalists at the 1984 Winter Paralympics
Austrian amputees
20th-century Austrian women
21st-century Austrian women